Beta Crateris, Latinized from β Crateris, is a binary star system in the southern constellation of Crater. It is visible to the naked eye with an apparent visual magnitude of 4.46. Based upon an annual parallax shift of 9.59 mas as seen from Earth, it is located around 340 light years from the Sun.

This is an astrometric binary star system with an orbital period of 6.0 years and a projected separation of 8.3 AU. The orbit has an estimated semimajor axis of 9.3 AU. The primary, component A, is listed as an A-type giant star with a stellar classification of A2 III. However, Houk and Smith-Moore (1988) give a main sequence classification of A1 V, while Abt and Morrell (1995) list it as a subgiant star with a class of A2 IV. The spectrum shows enhanced barium, possibly as a result of a previous mass transfer event.

The companion, component B, is a white dwarf of class DA with an effective temperature of 36,885 K that has been cooling down for around four million years. It has an unusually low mass, 43% that of the Sun, suggesting that the white dwarf progenitor may have transferred matter to its companion. Alternative scenarios require either the evolution of a triple star system, or a binary system with highly eccentric orbit resulting in grazing interactions. The dwarf is a source of X-ray emission.

Name
This star was one of the set assigned by the 16th century astronomer Al Tizini to Al Sharāsīf (ألشراسيف), the Ribs (of Hydra), which included the stars from β Crateris westward through κ Hydrae.

According to the catalogue of stars in the Technical Memorandum 33-507 - A Reduced Star Catalog Containing 537 Named Stars, Al Sharāsīf were the title for two stars : β Crateris as Al Sharasīf II and κ Hydrae as Al Sharasīf I.

References

External links

A-type giants
Spectroscopic binaries
Crateris, Beta
Crater (constellation)
Durchmusterung objects
Crateris, 11
097277
054682
4343